The 1989 Camel GT Championship season was the 19th season of the IMSA GT Championship auto racing series.  It was for GTP and Lights classes of prototypes, as well as Grand Tourer-style racing cars which ran in the GTO and GTU classes, as well as a tube-frame American Challenge (AC) class during select GT-only rounds.  It began February 4, 1989, and ended October 22, 1989, after twenty rounds.

Schedule
The GT and Prototype classes did not participate in all events, nor did they race together at shorter events.  The AC class only participated in GT-only events.  Races marked with All had all classes on track at the same time.

Season results

References

External links
 World Sports Racing Prototypes - 1989 IMSA GT Championship results

IMSA GT Championship seasons
IMSA GT Championship